Eleazar Huerta Valcárcel (22 December 1903, Tobarra, Albacete – 1974, Santiago de Chile) was a Spanish lawyer, poet and politician. The son of Eleazar Huerta Puche and Milagros Valcárcel García, he died in Chile, where he had lived in exile since the Spanish Civil War, aged 70. He served as the 47th Solicitor General of Spain.

Spanish expatriates in Chile
Spanish politicians
People from the Province of Albacete
Date of death unknown
1974 deaths
1903 births
20th-century poets